Nyköping is a locality and the seat of Nyköping Municipality, Södermanland County, Sweden with 32,759 inhabitants as of 2017. The city is also the capital of Södermanland County.

Including Arnö, the locality on the southern shore of the bay just a couple of kilometres from the city centre, Nyköping would have above 36,000 inhabitants. Commonly, Arnö is referred to as a part of the city proper. The municipality is much larger, although sparsely populated outside of the urban area.

Nyköping directly translates to Newmarket into English. The prefix Ny is translated as New and köping is an old Swedish word for a market place and a commonly used suffix for cities in the south central region of the country (see Köping). The city is located near the open Baltic Sea on the Stadsfjärden inlet, and is regarded as a coastal location. Rivers Nyköpingsån and Kilaån reach the Baltic Sea through the southern end of downtown. The former river splits the town down the middle into an eastern and western part. There are multiple other inlets in the municipality, which has an extensive shoreline.

Typical of the region, the landscape is influenced by post-glacial rebound after the latest ice age. For thousands of years, the land of downtown Nyköping was an archipelago where the hills in town today formed many islands, while the flatter parts of the town were the seafloor.

The municipal border between Nyköping and Norrköping marks the point where the historical lands Götaland and Svealand converge on the east coast.

It retains an oceanic/continental climate hybrid, causing warm summers and winters around the freezing point with variable snow cover.

History 
The area bears traces of settlers since around 2000 BC. In the early medieval age, around 1000 AD, Nyköping was a capital of one of the many Swedish petty kingdoms. In the 13th century, construction on the Nyköping Fortress begun; the following century it became the strongest fortress in the country. The coat of arms probably depicts the fortress, or one of its towers.

In 1317 the Nyköping Banquet took place, a renowned episode in Sweden's history, when King Birger of Sweden captured his two brothers as revenge for earlier sufferings and had them imprisoned without food until they starved to death. (See Nyköpings gästabud.)

The earliest known charter dates from 1444, making it one of the now defunct Cities in Sweden. In the 16th century Nyköping became the seat of Duke Charles, who later became Charles IX of Sweden. With the status of a Royal residential seat, Nyköping was at its peak of development.

In 1665 large parts of the city including the fortress were damaged in a fire. The same thing happened again in 1719 when Russian troops invaded the city. It was then rebuilt with its current street plan.

Nyköping was industrialized relatively early compared to the rest of Sweden. In the early 19th century, textile industry was established, and the population soon rose as Nyköping's industry grew. In 1879, C.A. Wedholms mejerikärlsfabrik was founded, starting to produce milk churns. Wedholms still has activity in Nyköping and is a milk cooling tank manufacturer.

20th century 

Nyköping was the town where Nordiska Kompaniet had its furniture factory. The business created a spin-off named ANA, which licence-built American and English cars, as Plymouth, De Soto, Hillman and Sunbeam. The company was later purchased by Saab Automobile and led to SAAB becoming the largest employer in the town during the 1980s, as well as the relocation of the headquarters to Spelhagen. But when GM bought SAAB from Investor AB, the headquarters was moved back to Trollhättan and about two thousand lost their jobs.

Military history 
Nyköping has been a stronghold for the reconnaissance squadrons of the Swedish Air Force. Between 1941 and 1980, the nearby Stockholm Skavsta Airport was hosting the Södermanland Wing (F 11) which had three squadrons with reconnaissance aircraft. It was the only dedicated reconnaissance wing in the Swedish Air Force. The city has also hosted the flying school of the Swedish Army which was located at Brandholmen between 1963 and 1985.

Geography

Position 
The northern areas of the city is on exactly the same parallel of 58° 46' N as Canadian 'polar bear capital of the world' Churchill, demonstrating how warm the climate is in comparison in spite of its northerly latitude. The southern edge of the municipality also straddles the same parallel as the northernmost point of mainland Scotland at Thurso – that has a much more narrower range of temperature. The southern edge of the municipality is the southernmost point of Svealand, the middle of Sweden's traditional three crown lands that once formed the country. The city is located at a few miles more southerly latitude than the country's northernmost west coast town of Strömstad.

Living environment 
Nyköping is the exodus of a small river named Nyköpingsån (Nyköping River), which runs through the city centre, dividing the city into a natural eastern and western part. Due to the narrowness of the river, there are a full seven crossings available for automobile traffic, one of them being for the E4. For pedestrians and bikers, an additional seven bridges are available, and in addition to that there's also one bridge for train traffic. All automobile bridges except E4 also carry pedestrian sidewalks, which means transport is seldom made longer than the actual distance. There is also a small pedestrian bridge in an unpopulated nature reserve called Hållet that is very close to the E4 route. The small river Kilaån separates Nyköping and Arnö, with that river being even narrower. Also separating Nyköping and Arnö is the so-called Stadsfjärden (the City bay), which is a bay stretching around the Arnö peninsula down to the neighboring municipality of Oxelösund. Stadsfjärden is primarily used for tourist shipping and canoeing, with an internationally renowned canoeing stadium being situated along the northern shore. The port is much smaller than Oxelösund's and is primarily used for civil traffic, as opposed to cargo shipments and ferry traffic which is dominated by nearby ports of Oxelösund and Nynäshamn. This is due to the port being some 15 kilometres from open sea as opposed to Oxelösund's position on the edge of the peninsula. Even though Nyköping is a relatively flat city there are some hills in the northern parts of the town, barely reaching 50 metres altitude. The city centre is essentially just above sea level and doesn't rise above 20 metres altitude, although it contains hills surrounding it.

Populated areas of Nyköping 
 Brandholmen
 Brandkärr
 Bryngelstorp
 Ekensberg
 Fågelbo
 Isaksdal
 Harg
 Herrhagen (at Arnö)
 Högbrunn
 Kuggnäs (at Arnö)
 Långsätter (at Arnö)
 Malmbryggshagen Myntan (at Arnö) Oppeby Oxbacken Påljungshage Rosenkälla Stenkulla Väster (the West)
 Öster (the East)
 Östra bergen (the Eastern Mountains)

The area of Gumsbacken only carries a large shopping mall centre but is part of the city proper.

 Connected areas 

The rural localities of Sjösa, Bergshammar, Svalsta and Enstaberga located within  are connected to the city centre by cycle tracks with permanent floodlightning. In addition there is a nature and coastal area called Tjuvholmen east of the city centre that is part of the locality with many holiday homes. Tjuvholmen lacks an asphalted access road and is in general seen as a rural area in spite of its proximity to the city centre. East of Arnö on the southern shore there are similar areas such as Örstig which is connected by asphalt road and cycle tracks to Arnö and Nyköping. Other nearby rural areas on the southern shore include holiday home areas such as Linudden and Örstigsnäs and also the coastal camping place of Strandstugeviken''.

Elections 

Nyköping is the seat of Nyköping Municipality and this table just records how the urban area (including Arnö) has voted, contrasting with the rural electoral wards.

Riksdag

Transportation

Buses 
Nyköping's intercity and city bus-links are operated by Nobina Sverige. The city bus network consists of seven lines:

Map of city bus lines

Coaches to Stockholm and Gothenburg are operated by Flixbus.

Rail 

The city is located on a branch line to the Södra stambanan. Scheduled railway connections on the line is provided by SJ AB. These are mostly operated by Rc-hauled trainsets. SJ does currently not operate any X 2000 services to Nyköping.

The planned new high-speed rail Ostlänken going from Stockholm to Linköping will have two stops in the city, one at the new planned train station and one at Skavsta Airport. The railway will later be connected with the planned high-speed rail Götalandsbanan going from Linköping to Gothenburg Which will make it possible to go from Stockholm to Gothenburg in 2 hours. It's planned to be finished between 2033 and 2035.

Air 
Stockholm-Skavsta Airport offers intra-European routes on Ryanair and Wizz Air. The airport is located about 10 kilometers outside of the city and is connected with bus from the city center.

Climate 
Nyköping has, along with the rest of Mälardalen, a relatively mild humid continental climate (Dfb). In recent decades the climate has more resembled a four-season oceanic climate. Winter averages around the freezing point during daytime with only the cold nights causing winter conditions in many winters. However, both summers and winters have been significantly warmer and colder, respectively, than the averages. Winters are normally tempered by the Gulf Stream influence from the west and to a lesser degree the Baltic Sea to the east, but when cold air breaks through cold temperatures can occur, sometimes for a prolonged time. As typical of southern Sweden there is a slight seasonal lag, rendering that the warmest period is often occurring during the second half of summer.

The inland areas of the municipality are very much similar to the coastal areas, but the weather station at Skavsta shows lower summer mean temperatures than Oxelösund's, indicating that the inner city wider urban area nearer the water has milder nights year round. Both stations are within a meteorological relevant range from the city centre.

Sports 
Nyköping has two major sport clubs:

 Nyköpings Boll-och Idrottsällskap is the local Division 1 football club; they play their home matches at the Rosvalla Nyköping Eventcenter.
 Nyköpings Hockey is the local ice hockey club; its home rink is PEAB Arena.

The city is yet to have a team in the major football or hockey leagues of Sweden, with stints in the second tiers being the greatest achievements for both sides.

Sights 
Nyköping includes the cinema Biostaden which houses Sweden's largest cinema screen. The cinema was newly built from the ground in 2012. It is located in Högbrunn.

Nyköpings Stadsbibliotek (Nyköping City Library) is located in the city center, which offers various book clubs and activities for children. There is free Internet access and wifi for visitors. It has books of all genres, for all ages, and in many languages.

Twin cities 

 Iisalmi, Finland
 Lauf an der Pegnitz, Germany
 Notodden, Norway
 Nykøbing Falster, Denmark
 Salacgrīva, Latvia
 Vyborg, Russia
 Kangaroo Point, Australia
 Ōarai, Japan

References

External links 

  
Visit Nyköping – The official visitors' guide
Nyköping Facebook – The official Facebook-page

 
Coastal cities and towns in Sweden
County seats in Sweden
Market towns in Sweden
Municipal seats of Södermanland County
Populated places in Södermanland County
Populated places in Nyköping Municipality
Swedish municipal seats
Viking Age populated places
Cities in Södermanland County